The 1975 Tampa Bay Rowdies season was the first season of the club's existence.

Kit
During the outdoor campaign occasionally a random Rowdies player could be seen wearing the collarless jersey used by all players during the 1975 indoor season earlier in the year, but by season's end the full-collar style that would become so familiar in all of Tampa Bay's later NASL campaigns eventually took over. The striping sequence on the sleeves was also different. Tampa Bay would not wear a cuff-style collar again until the 1986–87 American Indoor Soccer Association season.

Club

Roster

Management and technical staff
 George Strawbridge, Jr., owner
 Beau Rogers, general manager
 Eddie Firmani, head coach
 Chas Serednesky, business manager
 Francisco Marcos, director of public relations
 Alfredo Beronda, equipment manager

Honors 
The Rowdies received eight individual honors following the 1975 NASL season. 
 Soccer Bowl Man of the Match: Stewart Jump
 NASL All-Star, First Team: Farrukh Quraishi
 NASL All-Star, Second Team: Stewart Jump, John Boyle, Stewart Scullion
 NASL All-Star, Honorable Mention: John Sissons, Clyde Best, Derek Smethurst

Review 
The 1975 North American Soccer League season was the Tampa Bay Rowdies first outdoors. The expansion Rowdies had only recently completed a successful debut in the 1975 indoor tournament, by finishing as runners-up. With Eddie Firmani as coach and John Boyle as team captain, they opened outdoor play by splitting a pair of preseason friendlies versus the San Antonio Thunder.

Tampa Bay's first regular season match was played at Tampa Stadium against the Rochester Lancers before 12,133 paying customers (and another 3,000-plus, who were there for free). Their first ever goal was scored by Derek Smethurst in the opening half. The first goal conceded by the Rowdies occurred at the 27:59 mark when Tommy Ord put one past Tampa Bay goalie Mike Hewitt. The game remained tied 1–1 at the end of 90 minutes. At 3:45 of golden goal overtime, second-half substitute, Alex Pringle, recorded the teams' first ever game-winning goal. The game also saw Firmani (age 41) insert himself into the lineup with about one minute remaining in regulation. This was because several players had been delayed in Europe, causing the Tampa Bay roster to be a bit thin for the match.

The Rowdies success carried on as they went on to record winning streaks of six and seven games during the regular season. Tampa Bay finished the year tied with the Portland Timbers for the best record in the league with a mark of 16–6. The winning ways continued into the playoffs as they did not concede a single goal in any round. They defeated Toronto Metros-Croatia, 1–0, in the quarterfinals. That was followed by a 3–0 dismantling of 1974 league runners-up, and Florida Derby rival, Miami Toros in the semifinal, which sent them into the Soccer Bowl.

The Soccer Bowl '75 championship match featured the two teams with the best records in the NASL, the Rowdies and Portland. Coincidentally both squads were also expansion teams. Behind a stingy defense and a pair of second half goals by Arsène Auguste and Clyde Best, Tampa Bay came away the victors, 2–0. Defender Stewart Jump was named man of the match. This would be the Rowdies only outdoor NASL championship.

Competitions

Friendlies

NASL regular season

Division standings

Overall League Placing

Results summaries

Results by round

Match reports

NASL Playoffs

Bracket

Match reports

Statistics

Player movement

References 

1975
Tampa Bay Rowdies (1975–1993) seasons
Tampa Bay Rowdies
Tampa Bay Rowdies
Tampa Bay Rowdies
Sports in Tampa, Florida